Waipiʻo Peninsula Soccer Stadium is a 4,500 seat soccer-specific stadium located on the grounds of the Waipiʻo Soccer Complex in Waipahu, Hawaii. WPSS also boasts two main locker rooms, two training rooms, concession booths and administrative offices.

The stadium is used by the University of Hawaii Rainbow Wahine (women's) soccer team, along with several senior and junior local teams from the island of Oahu.

Outside of the stadium, the complex features 23 FIFA regulation soccer pitches.

References

External links
Waipio Peninsula Soccer Stadium at the University of Hawaii website
Waipio Soccer Complex at Soccer Hawaii

Soccer venues in Hawaii
Hawaii Rainbow Warriors and Rainbow Wahine
College soccer venues in the United States
Sports venues completed in 2000
Buildings and structures in Honolulu County, Hawaii
2000 establishments in Hawaii
Sports complexes in the United States